Oak leafroller (or oak leaf roller) can refer to several species of moth that feed on leaves and roll them for nests:

In Europe
Tortrix viridana, commonly known as the European oak leafroller or green oak moth

In North America
Archips semiferanus, commonly known as the oak leafroller in eastern North America
Choristoneura fractivittana, Canada and the eastern United States

Animal common name disambiguation pages